A total lunar eclipse will occur 30 May 2170. It will be the greatest lunar eclipse of Lunar Saros 133 as well as the largest and darkest lunar eclipse of the 22nd century.

Related eclipses

Saros cycle

Half-Saros cycle
A lunar eclipse will be preceded and followed by solar eclipses by 9 years and 5.5 days (a half saros). This lunar eclipse is related to two annular solar eclipses of Solar Saros 140.

References 

Future lunar eclipses
Central total lunar eclipses
22nd-century lunar eclipses